Henry Taylor (born 11 April 1994) is an English professional rugby union player who plays for Saracens as a Scrum-half. He will join Northampton Saints for the start of the 2019–20 season.

References

External links
Saracens profile

1994 births
Living people
English rugby union players
Northampton Saints players
Rugby union players from Buckinghamshire
Rugby union scrum-halves
Saracens F.C. players